The lemon-rumped tanager (Ramphocelus icteronotus) is a species of bird in the family Thraupidae. It is sometimes considered a subspecies of the flame-rumped tanager. It is found from Panama to Ecuador. Its natural habitats are subtropical or tropical moist lowland forests and heavily degraded former forest.

Gallery

References

lemon-rumped tanager
Birds of the Tumbes-Chocó-Magdalena
Endemic birds of Peru
lemon-rumped tanager
lemon-rumped tanager